Thomas English may refer to:

Thomas English (mayor) (1820–1884), South Australian architect, politician and mayor of Adelaide, 1862–1863
Thomas Dunn English (1819–1902), American Democratic Party politician, author and songwriter from New Jersey
Thomas Crisp English, British surgeon 
Tom English (musician), drummer with the English band Maxïmo Park
Tommy English (footballer) (born 1961), English footballer
Tom English (footballer, born 1981), English footballer
Tommy English (loyalist) (1960–2000), Northern Irish paramilitary and politician
Thomas English (Medal of Honor) (1819–?), American Civil War sailor
Tom English (rugby union) (born 1991), Australian professional rugby union player
Thomas Mylius Savage English (1868–1949), British naturalist